Naalu Veli Nilam is a 1959 Indian Tamil-language drama film directed by Muktha V. Srinivasan. The film stars S. V. Sahasranamam, M. Pandaribai and M. Mynavathi. It is based on the play of the same name. The film was released on 2 September 1959.

Cast 
List adapted from the database of Film News Anandan.

Male cast
S. V. Sahasranamam
S. V. Subbaiah
Kuladeivam Rajagopal
R. Muthuraman
A. Veerappan

Female cast
M. Pandari Bai
M. Mynavathi
Devika
S. N. Lakshmi

Production 
Naalu Veli Nilam was adapted from the Seva Stage play of the same name. The film adaptation was produced by S. V. Sahasranamam (who also acted in the play) and was directed by Muktha V. Srinivasan. Story, screenplay and dialogues were written by writer and novelist T. Janakiraman. Nimai Gosh was in charge of cinematography while editing was done by D. Vijayarangam and K. Durai. Kalasaagaram Rajagopal was in charge of art direction. Choreography was done by Madhavan, Chinnilal and Sampathkumar. Still photography was done by B. Ranganathan. The film was shot at Bharani Studios and processed at Vijaya laboratory.

Soundtrack 
Music was composed by K. V. Mahadevan and M. K. Athmanathan while the lyrics were penned by A. Maruthakasi and M. K. Athmanathan. A folk song, a Thiruvarutpa by Ramalinga Swamigal and three songs by Bharathiyar were also included in the film.

Reception 
The film was a loss to Sahasranamam. He mortgaged his house, paid compensation to the distributors and paid the balance fee to Pandari Bai and Mynavathi. The film is remembered for its story and the memorable songs.

References

External links 

1959 drama films
1959 films
Films directed by Muktha Srinivasan
Films scored by K. V. Mahadevan
Indian drama films
Indian films based on plays